Aahl  may refer to:

All American Hockey League (2008–11), professional ice hockey league started in 2008 that was based in the mid-western United States
All-American Hockey League (1987–1988), formerly the Continental Hockey League; in 1988, it merged with the Atlantic Coast Hockey League to form the East Coast Hockey League
Australian Animal Health Laboratory in Geelong, Victoria
American Amateur Hockey League, amateur ice hockey league that operated 1896–1918